Guy Webster may refer to

 Guy Webster (photographer)
 Guy Webster (musician)

Webster, Guy